ZBS Foundation, a small non-profit audio production company, was founded by Thomas Lopez (aka "Meatball Fulton") in 1970 with a grant from Robert E. Durand as a working commune, located on a donated farm in Upstate New York. ZBS stands for "Zero Bull Shit". The commune's purpose was to raise consciousness through media, specifically full-cast audio dramas. The foundation is "one of the most prolific producers of contemporary radio drama."

The commune started with 18 people, and an island in the Hudson River was chosen as the location because it was between New York City and Montreal. Eventually, the commune disintegrated, and the foundation moved to create an artists-in-residence program over the next decade. Allen Ginsberg recorded at ZBS in 1981, and Laurie Anderson visited in 1975. Philip Glass also worked on the opera Einstein on the Beach at ZBS. The residency program ended in the mid 1980s.

The foundation also became the outlet for audio dramas written by writer/producer Lopez. His dramatic programs, notably Ruby the Galactic Gumshoe, The Fourth Tower of Inverness and Travels with Jack Flanders, are noted for their meticulous production values and New Age mysticism. Lopez has won numerous awards including the Prix Italia, and his work enjoys a cult following.

ZBS did a 1984-85 radio series, The Cabinet of Dr. Fritz, later releasing some shows in the series on cassettes and CDs. These productions were recorded binaurally using a Neumann Ku81 Kunstkopf microphone. ZBS also produced a widely acclaimed dramatization of Stephen King's The Mist, recording in binaural sound.

Releases

References

External links
 ZBS Foundation
 Whirlitzer of Wisdoms
 NATF Interview with Thomas Lopez, by the National Audio Theatre Festival, an organization that includes Lopez as one of its advisors.
 Artist in Residence program
 The Great ZBS Data Collection

 
Mass media companies of the United States
American artist groups and collectives